Subacute thyroiditis is a form of thyroiditis that can be a cause of both thyrotoxicosis and hypothyroidism. It is uncommon and can affect individuals of both sexes, occurring three times as often in women than in men. and people of all ages. The most common form, subacute granulomatous, or de Quervain's, thyroiditis manifests as a sudden and painful enlargement of the thyroid gland accompanied with fever, malaise and muscle aches. Indirect evidence has implicated viral infection in the etiology of subacute thyroiditis. This evidence is limited to preceding upper respiratory tract infection, elevated viral antibody levels, and both seasonal and geographical clustering of cases. There may be a genetic predisposition. 

Nishihara and coworkers studied the clinical features of subacute thyroiditis in 852 mostly 40- to 50-year-old women in Japan. They noted seasonal clusters (summer to early autumn) and most subjects presented with neck pain. Fever and symptoms of thyrotoxicosis were present in two thirds of subjects. Upper respiratory tract infections in the month preceding presentation were reported in only 1 in 5 subjects. Recurrent episodes following resolution of the initial episode were rare, occurring in just 1.6% of cases. Laboratory markers for thyroid inflammation and dysfunction typically peaked within one week of onset of illness.


Types
 Subacute granulomatous thyroiditis (De Quervain thyroiditis)
 Subacute lymphocytic thyroiditis
 Postpartum thyroiditis
 Palpation thyroiditis

References

External links 

Thyroid disease